Thubana costimaculella is a moth in the family Lecithoceridae. It was described by Snellen in 1903. It is found on Java.

The wingspan is about 18 mm. The forewings are purplish brown with an ochreous-yellow dot at the base and an ochreous-yellow triangular area at the margin. The hindwings are greyish brown.

References

Moths described in 1903
Thubana